Fulbright Hall, formerly known as The Everglades, is an undergraduate residence hall on the Foggy Bottom campus of the George Washington University (GW), named after J. William Fulbright, located at 2223 H St., Northwest, Washington, D.C., in the Foggy Bottom neighborhood.

History
The building was designed by Joseph Abel in the Art Deco style and completed in 1939.  The Art Deco detailing can be seen in the curved metal surrounding the main entrance and the cast stone at the roofline with zigzag motifs and vertical banding.  It was acquired by the university originally for use as a residence for nurses and was renamed in honor of Senator J. William Fulbright on May 6, 1996.  He had earned a LL.B. degree from GW in 1934.  It was listed on the District of Columbia Inventory of Historic Sites and the National Register of Historic Places in 2010.

See also
H.B. Burns Memorial Building
Corcoran Hall
Madison Hall 
Munson Hall
Jacqueline Bouvier Kennedy Onassis Hall
Stockton Hall
Hattie M. Strong Residence Hall

References

Residential buildings completed in 1939
University and college buildings on the National Register of Historic Places in Washington, D.C.
Art Deco architecture in Washington, D.C.
George Washington University buildings and structures
Foggy Bottom
1939 establishments in Washington, D.C.